Daniel Andrew Sharman (born 25 April 1986) is an English actor. He is known for his roles as Isaac Lahey on the television series Teen Wolf (2012–2014), Kaleb Westphall / Kol Mikaelson on The Originals (2014–2015), Troy Otto on Fear the Walking Dead (2017), Lorenzo de' Medici in Medici: The Magnificent (2018), and the Weeping Monk in Cursed (2020). He also starred in the film Immortals (2011).

Early life and education 
Sharman was born and raised in Hackney, London. He started acting as a child at the age of nine when he auditioned for the Royal Shakespeare Company and was selected out of hundreds of other children. Of his venture into the dramatic arts, he stated: "I just adored it. Between Macbeth and Henry VI with all of the armour and the blood and everything, it was just fantastic as a kid. It was the best thing ever." Sharman stayed with the Royal Shakespeare Company for two plays: The Park in 1995 (age 9) and Macbeth in 1996 (age 10). 

Sharman attended Mill Hill School and also the Arts Educational School, both in London. During his school years, he acted in the play "Kvetch" that made it to the Edinburgh Fringe festival. He also acted in the touring play The Winslow Boy in 2002 at age 16.

For three years, from 2004 to 2007, Sharman studied at the London Academy of Music and Dramatic Art, gaining a Bachelor of Arts degree in acting and graduating with honors. After that, he performed in many theatrical productions in London and Europe.

Career
Sharman's first feature film role was in the independent film The Last Days of Edgar Harding, in which he played a musician. In 2010, he was cast as Ares, the Greek god of war, in the fantasy film Immortals with Mickey Rourke, Kellan Lutz and Henry Cavill among others; the film was released in 2011. Sharman initially had difficulty transition to acting on film, as he found it "odd and unnatural", but he eventually adjusted. Sharman also appeared in the horror film The Collection, released in November 2012. 

Sharman's television credits include roles in Judge John Deed, Inspector Lewis and the television films Starting Over and When Calls the Heart . Beginning in 2012, Sharman had a major recurring role as werewolf Isaac Lahey in MTV's supernatural drama series Teen Wolf. In March 2014, after the season 3 finale, it was announced that Sharman would be leaving the series as he wanted to explore other opportunities. 

In 2013, Sharman narrated the audiobook version of Cassandra Clare's young adult novel Clockwork Princess, the third and final installment of her Infernal Devices trilogy. 

He joined The Originals as the recurring character Kaleb Westphall in May 2014. In March 2015, it was confirmed that Sharman had landed the lead role in the CBS medical drama pilot LFE opposite actress Melissa Leo However, the pilot was ultimately not picked up by the network. In 2017, he joined the cast of AMC's Fear the Walking Dead as a series regular in the role of Troy Otto. The third season of the series premiered on 5 June of the same year.

In 2015, he joined the Williamstown Theatre Festival for the play Off the Main Road, which starred Kyra Sedgwick.

On 10 August 2017, it was reported that Sharman had been cast in the lead role in Medici: The Magnificent. He portrays Lorenzo de' Medici for the planned two season run of the series. The two seasons of Medici: The Magnificent serve as second and third season of the Medici franchise and are set 20 years after the events of the loosely connected first season, named Medici: Masters of Florence.

In March 2019, Sharman joined Cursed, a Netflix television series based on a re-imagining of the Arthurian legend.

Filmography

Film

Television

Music videos

Awards and nominations

References

External links

Male actors from London
Living people
English male television actors
20th-century English male actors
21st-century English male actors
English male child actors
English male film actors
English male stage actors
Royal Shakespeare Company members
People educated at Mill Hill School
Alumni of the London Academy of Music and Dramatic Art
People from the London Borough of Hackney
English expatriates in the United States
1986 births